The men's 100 metres at the 2013 World Championships in Athletics was held at the Luzhniki Stadium on 10 and 11 August.

Two national records were set in the preliminary round and Zhang Peimeng tied his own Chinese national record while qualifying in the heats.  Zhang improved his record to 10.00 in the semifinal, but failed to advance to the final, it took 9 thousands faster as Christophe Lemaitre was the last qualifier.  He was also timed officially in 10.00 in the same second heat of the semifinal round.  Jamaica qualified four individuals into the final.

With his record, Usain Bolt was the favorite and with defending champion Yohan Blake injured, Justin Gatlin was Bolt's closest expected rival.  Gatlin did have an early season victory against Bolt.

The final was held in a rainstorm.  Gatlin got the best start, but Bolt, who overtook Gatlin, pulled away for the win. Nesta Carter chased them to finish third. Under the conditions, the medallists were the only finalists to improve upon their semifinal time in better weather earlier in the evening.

With the Russian all comers record at 10.03 coming into this meet, three competitors improved upon this mark through the heats.  First Kemar Bailey-Cole improved the record to 10.02 in heat 1, which stood for less than 10 minutes when Gatlin took the record to 9.99 in heat 3 and 15 minutes later, Mike Rodgers improved it to 9.98 in heat 6.  In the first semifinal, Gatlin regained the record, running 9.94, which lasted until the next semifinal when Nickel Ashmeade ran 9.90. Bolt settled the issue in the final with his 9.77.

Records
Prior to the competition, the records were as follows:

Qualification standards

Schedule

Results

Preliminary round
Qualification: First 2 in each heat (Q) and the next 3 fastest (q) advanced to the heats.

Despite being last in his heat and among the slowest runners to feature at the championships, Afghanistan's Masoud Azizi was disqualified for performance-enhancing drug use after a positive test for nandrolone.

Wind:Heat 1: -0.4 m/s, Heat 2: +0.3 m/s, Heat 3: -0.5 m/s, Heat 4: -0.4 m/s

Heats

Qualification: First 3 in each heat (Q) and the next 3 fastest (q) advanced to the semifinals.

Wind:Heat 1: −0.2 m/s, Heat 2: −0.4 m/s, Heat 3: −0.3 m/s, Heat 4: −0.2 m/s, Heat 5: −0.1 m/s, Heat 6: −0.1 m/s, Heat 7: −0.4 m/s

Semifinals
Qualification: First 2 in each heat (Q) and the next 2 fastest (q) advance to the finals.

Wind:Heat 1: -0.2 m/s, Heat 2: +0.4 m/s, Heat 3: +0.1 m/s

Final
Wind: -0.3 m/s

References

External links
100 metres results at IAAF website

100
100 metres at the World Athletics Championships